The United States Navy maintained a number of naval installations in New Zealand during the Pacific War of World War II. 

Many were built by the US Navy Seabees, Naval Construction Battalions, during  as part of the Pacific War. New Zealand was used for staging and training troops before action and for R&R-rest and recreation after action. The Red Cross operated five dinning clubs. For the wounded, there were 19 hospitals in New Zealand that could handle up to 10,000 patients. Most Naval activities were at Naval Base Auckland and Naval Base Wellington. The bases were closed in 1944 as troops moved to more northern US bases.

History
The first troop arrived at New Zealand on 12 June 1942 at Waitematā Harbour in Auckland. The first troop arrived at Wellington Harbour at the city of Wellington on 14 June 1942 aboard the troopship USS Wakefield. The US ship to arrive at New Zealand was the USS President Polk (AP-103) on 6 January 1942 into Wellington's Queen's Wharf.  The President Polk had 55 USAAF pilots and 55 Curtiss P-40 and 4 [Douglas C-53 aircraft aboard. The President Polk departed San Francisco to take aircraft to US Naval Base Philippines, but Philippines was not safe any longer.  President Polk fuel in Wellington and was redirected to Naval Base Brisbane. New Zealand entered World War II with Great Britain by declaring war on Nazi Germany in 1939. New Zealand had entered the war with Empire of Japan as the Royal New Zealand Navy had lost to ships to Japanese torpedoes on 10 December 1941: the battleship HMS Prince of Wales  and the battlecruiser HMS Repulse were sunk by Japanese torpedoes. The war was close to home with Hong Kong taken on December 25, Singapore 15 February 1942. Then just 3198 miles (5146 km) 250 people were killed in the bombing attack on Darwin. As such most New Zealanders welcomed these US Troops. 

New Zealand had asked the United Kingdom for help in protecting New Zealand. Winston Churchill requested Franklin D. Roosevelt send troops to New Zealand on 5 March 1942, so New Zealander troops could stay in Egypt as part of the North African campaign, Roosevelt agreed and sent troops. New Zealand and US Naval Base Australia became the staging for the Pacific War in the South West Pacific theatre, the Philippines, New Guinea and the Dutch East Indies.
The Red Cross ran Red Cross clubs in Warkworth, Masterton, and at the Hotel Cecil near Wellington railway station. In Auckland Hotels there were officers Red Cross clubs and enlisted men's club. The clubs offered a slice of home with US food, library, table tennis and pool, music, and dance. The YMCA in Auckland held events for the troops also. There were some problems like the Battle of Manners Street, a riot at Te Aro, Wellington on  3 April 1943.<ref>The Yanks are Coming: The American Invasion of New Zealand 1942-1944 by Harry Bioletti (1989, Century Hutchinson, Auckland) </ref> In December 1942 there were over 15,000 US Troops in New Zealand. In 1943 and the first half of 1944 there were about 30,000 Troops stations in New Zealand. The troop were either getting ready to deploy or returning from action. By the end of 1943 the war and moved closer to Japan and the US Navy had built new base closer to the action, so fewer troops were stationed at New Zealand. In October 1943 the Navy took the US Marines way. US Naval Base Auckland was closed October 1944. About 1,500 New Zealand women joined Operation Magic Carpet as war brides and traveled to the United States. US Forces in New Zealandnzhistory.govt.nz

For the International Geophysical Year of 1957-58, U.S. forces returned to New Zealand to set up supply lines for the US Antarctic Research Program. The U.S. presence in Antarctica was continued beyond 1957 and became Operation Deep Freeze. For many years there was a U.S. presence at Harewood Airport in Christchurch, which was then shifted to the new Christchurch International Airport. Military Airlift Command maintained a military airlift support detachment at the airport for many years, often using Air National Guard aircraft. 

 Bases in Auckland 
Naval Base Auckland, at Waitematā Harbour: Fleet Post Office (FPO) #132 SF
Naval Operating Base Auckland, FPO# 1500 
Hobson Park Hospital, 1,000 beds (Navy Mobile Hospital No.4)
Fuel Tank Farm, Northcote, Auckland
Avondale Naval Hospital, Avondale, Auckland, 2,000 bed, built by Seebees 25th CB
Mechanics Bay, Auckland, 1,340 Navy men, crew off ships docked in the harbour for repair.
Sylvia Park Stores, Mount Wellington, Auckland
Mangere Crossing Stores, Māngere, Auckland
Halsey Street Store, Wynyard Quarter, Auckland
Shore Patrol Base (MP), on Airedale Street
Hilldene, Papakura, Auckland
Little Riverina, Wilsons Road, Warkworth
Tamaki Stores, Glen Innes, Auckland
Kauri Point Armament Depot, US Navy Magazines
Whangateau Hall & Reserve
At Auckland there were many small, medium and large camps that could house 29,500 Troops:
Victoria Park, Auckland US Troop Camp
US Navy Mobile Hospital Auckland 
Auckland outlining camps
US Navy Magazines and staging camp Motutapu Island
Camp Hale 
Cornwall Hospital at Cornwall Park Hospital, 1,500 beds
Pakiri Beach Camp 
Hillcrest Camp, Anti-Aircraft Artillery 

 Devonport Naval Base 
Devonport Naval Base is the Royal New Zealand Navy's principal naval base and shipyard, in Auckland. The base and its drydocks were also used by the US Navy during World War II. At the base are the Calliope Drydock, Naval Health Unit, training base, a jetty used for training, and port operations. 
HMNZS Philomel, training base.
HMNZS Tamaki'', training base on Motuihe Island

Wellington 
Base at Wellington, Wellington Harbour and on the Kapiti Coast District: FPO# 133
Oriental Parade, Wellington, Major Base
Porirua Harbour base
 Naval Base Hospital No. 4, Wellington, New Zealand 
Silverstream Hospital 
Kaiwharawhara Park, Kaiwharawhara, Wellington
Troop camps for 21,000 troops: 
Wellington outlining camps
Hotel St George, Wellington Office Navy and Marine staff
Anderson Park Camp, Wellington, for 4,000 US Navy personnel and 400-bed hospital 
Central Park, Wellington, Camp for Navy and Marine
Port Underwood training camp
Camp Paekakariki at Paekākāriki, on old golf course, now a town
Camp Russell now Queen Elizabeth Park at Paekākāriki
Camp McKay (also spelled Mackay) at Paekākāriki, MacKay's Crossing, now Whareroa Farm
Judgeford Valley at Pāuatahanui, small camp
Titahi Bay at Pāuatahanui, small camp
Small camps at: Judgeford, Paremata, Tītahi Bay, Trentham, Waterloo, Hutt Park, Gracefield, Stokes Valley, Kaiwharra, BoatHarbour, Hataitai, Johnsonville and Takapu Road.

Hutt 
Silverstream Naval Hospital, Upper Hutt
Trentham Racecourse Hospital, Trentham, Upper Hutt
Hutt Park, in Lower Hutt, Horse raceway to camp.
Petone landing beach training at Eastbourne
Māhia Peninsula landing beach training

Oriental Bay 
Boat Harbour at Oriental Bay was a major US Navy service and repair facility for landing craft. The Landing Craft were used in amphibious landing training near Wellington before the invasion of Tarawa. Before the expansion of Oriental Bay Base the Navy also used the Oriental Hotel for housing. Also at the base was small Naval hospital and dispensary. The hospital is now clubrooms of the Royal Port Nicholson Yacht Club. Ships arriving had Landing Craft Vehicle Personnel (LCVP) and Landing Craft Navigation (LCN) on board, some for training and others for upcoming operations.

Seabees 

United States Navy Construction Battalions ("Seabees"), did much construction work in New Zealand. Seabees were sent to New Zealand for rest and relaxation after building bases in the South Pacific, often around the clock. Seabee were sometimes also deployed to help the Royal New Zealand Air Force (RNZAF) and Royal New Zealand Navy. Turtle Bay Airfield at Naval Base Espiritu Santo and Kukum Field were some of the projects the Seabee worked with the RNZAF to build and operate. 6th Seabees rested and worked at the Victoria Park camp, also the Navy Mobile Hospital at Auckland. Seabees and troops at Naval Base Guadalcanal were sent to New Zealand for R&R after the Battle of Guadalcanal.  At the end of the war the US bases were turned over to New Zealand. 
Battalions that spent time in New Zealand were: 6, 11, 15, 18 24, 25, 27, 33, 35, 58, 63, and CBMU 502.

Airfields
Shared Royal New Zealand Air Force airbases during the war:
Wellington Airfield now Wellington Airport
RNZAF Base Auckland
RNZAF Base Ohakea
RNZAF Base Woodbourne
RNZAF Station Harewood now Christchurch Airport
Wigram Airfield now Wigram Airfield Circuit
RNZAF Station Te Pirita
Mangere Aerodrome

Gallery

See also
US Naval Advance Bases
Naval Base Fiji
World War II United States Merchant Navy
Military history of New Zealand during World War II
Coastal fortifications of New Zealand
Auckland War Memorial Museum
World War II United States Merchant Navy
Pacific Islands home front during World War II
Axis naval activity in New Zealand waters

External links
youtube.com US Troop training at New Zealand Port
youtube.com US Troop at New Zealand
youtube.com US Troop return to New Zealand
youtube.com A String Of Pearls: American Marines in New Zealand 1942 - 1944

References

Naval Stations of the United States Navy
Military installations of New Zealand
Military installations established in 1942
Military installations closed in 1944
1942 establishments in New Zealand
1940s disestablishments in New Zealand